Events in the year 826 in Japan.

Incumbents
Monarch: Junna

Births
January 22 – Emperor Montoku (died 858)

References

826
9th century in Japan